CSS Sea Bird was a sidewheel steamer in the Confederate States Navy.

Sea Bird was built at Keyport, New Jersey in 1854, was purchased by North Carolina at Norfolk, Virginia in 1861 and fitted for service with the Confederate States Navy. She was assigned to duty along the Virginia and North Carolina coasts with Lieutenant Patrick McCarrick, CSN, in command. Sea Bird served as the flagship of Confederate Flag Officer William F. Lynch's "Mosquito Fleet" during the hard-fought battles in defense of Roanoke Island on February 7–8, 1862, and Elizabeth City, North Carolina, on February 10 when she was rammed and sunk by USS Commodore Perry. Her casualties were two killed, four wounded, and the rest captured.

References

W. Craig Gaines, Encyclopedia of Civil War shipwrecks. Louisiana State University Press, 2008.

External links
 CSS Sea Bird Muster Roll.

Ships of the Confederate States Navy
Shipwrecks of the Carolina coast
Shipwrecks of the American Civil War
Maritime incidents in February 1862
Ships sunk in collisions
1854 ships
Ships built in Keyport, New Jersey